, is a non-resonant trans-Neptunian object and binary system from the Kuiper belt located in the outermost region of the Solar System, approximately  in diameter. It was first observed on 18 November 1998, by American astronomer Marc Buie and Robert Millis at the Kitt Peak National Observatory in Arizona, United States. After Charon in 1978, it was the first of nearly 100 satellites since discovered in the outer Solar System.

Orbit and classification 

Located beyond the orbit of Neptune,  is a non-resonant classical Kuiper belt object (cubewano) of the so-called hot population, which have higher inclinations than those of the cold population. It orbits the Sun at a distance of 40.4–48.5 AU once every 297 years (108,345 days; semi-major axis of 44.48 AU). Its orbit has an eccentricity of 0.09 and an inclination of 7° with respect to the ecliptic. The body's observation arc begins at Kitt Peak with its first observation on 18 November 1998.

Numbering and naming 

As of 2018, this minor planet has not been numbered nor named by the Minor Planet Center.

Physical characteristics 

 is expected to have a low albedo due to its blue (neutral) color. Other sources assume a higher albedo of 0.10 and 0.16, respectively (see below). It has a V–I color index of 0.91, notably lower than the mean-color index for cubewanos, and in between that of comets and Jupiter trojans.

Satellite 

 is a binary minor planet with a minor-planet moon in its orbit. On 22 December 2000, French astronomers Christian Veillet and Alain Doressoundiram in collaboration with J. Shapiro discovered the satellite using the Canada–France–Hawaii Telescope at Mauna Kea on the Big Island of Hawaii, United States. The discovery was announced on 16 April 2001 and received the provisional designation .

It was the first trans-Neptunian binary discovered after Charon in 1978, the largest satellite in the Pluto–Charon system. Since then nearly 100 trans-Neptunian binaries have been discovered.  is also one of the most symmetrical binaries known in the Solar System. The satellite has a highly eccentric orbit of approximately 0.8 with an exceptionally long orbital period of 587 days and a semi-major axis of 22,620 kilometers.

Diameter and albedo 

While the primary measures 148 kilometers, the satellite has a diameter of 123 kilometers (a ratio of 0.883) with a combined system diameter of 192 kilometers. The Collaborative Asteroid Lightcurve Link assumes an albedo of 0.10 and calculates a system diameter of 192 kilometers based on an absolute magnitude of 6.7, while Mike Brown finds a diameter of 267 kilometers with a lower albedo of 0.04.

Rotation period 

As of 2020, no rotational lightcurve of  has been obtained from photometric observations. The body's rotation period, pole and shape remain unknown.

References

External links 

 The binary Kuiper-belt object , publication in Nature, 18 April 2002
 The binary Kuiper Belt Object 1998 WW31, Christian Veillet - CFHT - 17 April 2002
 IAUC 7610: S/2000 (1998 WW_31) 1, satellite discovery – ''Central Bureau for Astronomical Telegrams, 16 April 2001
 Orbit Fit and Astrometric record for 1998 WW31, Marc W. Buie, SwRI (Space Science Department)
  and S/2000 1
 MPEC 2008-O05 : Distant Minor Planets (2008 AUG. 2.0 TT)
 
 

Minor planet object articles (unnumbered)

19981118